Ole Dehli (8 May 1851 – 27 February 1924) was a Norwegian jurist and organizational leader.

He was born on the Dehli farm in the parish of Ringsaker near Furnes in Hedmark, Norway. He was a son of farmers Hans Olsen Dehli (1816–1881) and Martha Larsdatter (1821–1882).
In October 1876 he married physician's daughter Maria Gyth (1851–1926). Their daughter Bergljot was married to Colonel Jacob Ager Laurantzon, making Ole Dehli a grandfather of agronomist Trygve Dehli Laurantzon, and another daughter Asta was married to priest Rolf Selvig. Their son Halfdan Gyth Dehli was known in aviation.

Ole Dehli was a co-founder of the organization Norges Kooperative Landsforening, and chaired the organization from 1906 to 1919.

References 

1851 births
1924 deaths
People from Ringsaker
Norwegian jurists
People from Furnes, Norway